Bruno Bertinato Oliveira (born 31 May, 1998) is a Brazilian footballer who plays as a goalkeeper for Italian Serie B side Venezia.

Early life
He was born in Curitiba, Brazil, but was also in possession of an Italian passport. Bruno grew up playing in the Coritiba Foot Ball Club youth teams having been spotted at the age of 11, at a summer camp held at Couto Pereira. As well as playing for Coritiba he received several call-ups by Brazil national age-group teams.

Career
He signed for Italian side Venezia in January 2019 with his youth side Coritiba retaining 20% of his playing rights.

Loans to Serie C
On September 9, 2020 Bruno joined Calcio Lecco 1912 on loan. After playing 9 games for Lecco in Serie C on 1 February 2021 he was announced as a new signing for Vis Pesaro dal 1898, also of Serie C, on a six-month loan contract until June 2021.

Debut for Venezia
He made his debut for Venezia on August 15, 2021 in the Coppa Italia at home against Frosinone, a 0-0 draw after 90 minutes, which Venezia won on penalties.

In June 2022 Bruno signed a new one-year contract with Venezia with the option of a further year. He made his debut appearance in Serie B on October 29, 2022 against Ascoli as a late substitute when Venezia starting goalkeeper Jesse Joronen was sent off. Bruno made his first league start for Venezia on December 4, 2022 against Ternana and performed well enough to be given the man-of-the-match award.

Personal life
Bruno has spoken of his admiration for the Brazil and Liverpool goalkeeper Alisson Becker. Bruno's agent is the brother of former Liverpool and Brazil goalkeeper Doni. Bruno has been very good friends with Matheus Cunha since they lived together as youngsters at Coritiba.

References

External links

1998 births
Living people
Brazilian footballers
Association football goalkeepers 
Venezia F.C. players
Calcio Lecco 1912 players
Vis Pesaro dal 1898 players
Serie B players
 Serie C players
Brazilian expatriate footballers
Brazilian expatriate sportspeople in Italy
Brazilian people of Italian descent
Brazilian emigrants to Italy